The water skiing competition at the 2017 World Games took place from July 25 to July 27, in Wrocław in Poland, at the Old Odra River.

Participating nations

Medal table

Events

Men

Women

References

External links
 The World Games 2017
 Result Book

 
2017 World Games